Jim Congrove (May 5, 1946 – January 10, 2012) was an American politician who served in the Colorado House of Representatives from the 27th district from 1995 to 1997 and in the Colorado Senate from the 19th district from 1997 to 2001.

He died of heart complications on January 10, 2012, in Arvada, Colorado at age 65.

References

1946 births
2012 deaths
Republican Party members of the Colorado House of Representatives
Republican Party Colorado state senators